Gerrhopilus hedraeus, also known as the Negros Island blind snake or Negros Island worm snake, is a species of snake in the family Gerrhopilidae. It is endemic to the Philippines.

References

hedraeus
Snakes of Southeast Asia
Reptiles of the Philippines
Endemic fauna of the Philippines
Taxa named by Jay M. Savage
Reptiles described in 1950